Darwin Salties is a NBL1 North club based in Darwin, Northern Territory. The club fields a team in both the Men's and Women's NBL1 North. The club is run under the joint management of Darwin Basketball Association (DBA) and Basketball Northern Territory (BNT). The Salties play their home games at Darwin Basketball Stadium.

Club history
On 10 November 2021, the NBL1 announced that a club from Darwin under the joint management of Darwin Basketball Association (DBA) and Basketball Northern Territory (BNT) would enter the Queensland-based NBL1 North competition in 2022. The club's entry saw the NBL1 become the first Australian sport league to have clubs based in and playing out of every state and territory in Australia.

On 20 December 2021, DBA announced that the club would be called the Darwin Salties. The club colours of blue and orange as well as the logo were also revealed. The Salties made their debut in the NBL1 North on 30 April 2022, with both teams recording wins in their first game.

References

External links

DBA's official website

2021 establishments in Australia
Basketball teams established in 2021
Sport in Darwin, Northern Territory
Basketball teams in Australia
Sports teams in the Northern Territory